Cranbrook/Canadian Rockies International Airport  is an international airport located  north of Cranbrook and  south-east of Kimberley, British Columbia, in the Canadian Rockies.

In 2008, YXC served over 106,277 passengers and in 2010 had 15,060 aircraft movements. The airport is operated 24 hours a day by the Cranbrook Flight Service Station.

It is classified as an airport of entry by Nav Canada and is staffed by the Canada Border Services Agency (CBSA). CBSA officers at this airport can handle general aviation aircraft only, with no more than 15 passengers. With prior notice, CBSA officers are able to handle commercial aircraft with up to 50 passengers, cost recovery is in effect for handling commercial aircraft.

Airlines and destinations

Incidents
On February 11, 1978 Flight 314, a Pacific Western Airlines 737-200 on a scheduled flight from Edmonton, via Calgary and Cranbrook, to Castlegar Airport crashed at Cranbrook Airport. The aircraft crashed after thrust reversers did not fully stow following a rejected landing that was executed in order to avoid a snowplow. The crash killed 42 of the 49 people on board.

Pictures

References

External links

Certified airports in British Columbia
Cranbrook, British Columbia
Regional District of East Kootenay